The Ice Climbing World Championship is a bi-annual international competition of ice climbing.

Championships

Men's results

Lead

Speed

Combined

Women's results

Lead

Speed

Combined

See also 

 Ice Climbing World Youth Championships

References 

Ice climbing
World championships in winter sports